Zeugites pringlei is a species of grasses found in Mexico.

References

Panicoideae